The Harricana River (also known as Harricanaw River) is a river in western Quebec and northeastern Ontario, Canada. While 80% of its drainage area is in Quebec, the river flows for a short distance through Ontario before it ends in Hannah Bay off James Bay.

Because of its undeveloped nature, easy upstream access, and the possibility to paddle to and take out at Moosonee, the Harricana River is popular for canoeing trips to James Bay.

Geography
The Harricana originates at Lake Blouin just north of Val-d'Or. From here De Montigny and Lemoine Lakes add to it before it flows through a series of lakes such as Malartic, La Motte, and Figuery Lakes. After flowing through the town of Amos, one more significant lake follows: Lake Obalski.

North of Amos the river crosses lush boreal forests, where extensive logging takes place. Toward its mouth at Hannah Bay, the forest gradually decreases and is replaced with many wetlands. Here the Harricana has considerable speed and a flat relief, flowing through undeveloped wilderness.

Notable tributaries
(in downstream order)
 Berry River
 Desboues River
 Miniac River
 Octave River
 Coigny River
 Plamondon River
 Samson River
 Turgeon River
 Theo River
 Wawagosic River
Kesagami River

History

The Harricana was first used by the Algonquins as a river route.

As a tributary of the James bay, and thus of the Hudson Bay, the Harricana River and its basin were part of Rupert's Land, de facto property of the Hudson's Bay Company by exclusive charter of 1670. But not until 1801, Alexander MacKenzie mapped the entire route of the river for the first time and identified it by name Harricanaw. In 1835, the map of Bradford called it Harricana. The Rupert's Land Act 1868 transferred the river and its basin to Canada and was officially annexed to the Province of Quebec in 1898. Thereafter colonization and settlement on the upper Harricana began in earnest.

In 1906, Henry O' Sullivan explored the shores of Harricana and in 1908, the first camps were established on its banks at the rapids. These were provisioning camps for the transcontinental railroad construction. A few years later, in 1910, the first colonists arrive and found the town of Amos at the place where the railroad crosses the river.

Toponymy
The river's name originates from the Algonquin word Nanikana, meaning "the main way"  or "Biscuit River", depending on the source. Biscuit (or ànakonà in Algonquin, aanakonaa in Ojibwe, and aaihkunaau in East James Bay Cree) refers to bannock-like the unusual flat stones, sand, limestone and clay concretions, which are found in the river, called Pierres de fée or "fairy stones."

Through history various spellings have been reported: "ᴀʌᴀᴋoʌᴀ" (anàkonà) (Algonquin), "anâkona" or "uhnahkoonah" (anaakonaa) (Ojibwe) and "ayukoona'w" (aaihkunaau) (Cree). The Algonquins also use the name Inikana, meaning "river route". A segment of the river in East James Bay Cree was called Waashahaau Siipii, which means "river to the bay".

See also
List of rivers of Ontario
List of rivers of Quebec

References

Rivers of Cochrane District
Tributaries of James Bay
Rivers of Abitibi-Témiscamingue
Rivers of Nord-du-Québec